Pacific Creek is a stream in the U.S. state of Wyoming. As the name implies, the stream starts just to the west of the Continental Divide and so is on the Pacific side of the divide. The waters from the stream eventually flow into the Pacific Ocean via the Green River and Colorado River. The stream is a notable landmark on the Oregon, California and Mormon emigration trails.

Tributaries
Morrow Creek joins Pacific Creek just over halfway through its journey.

History 
South Pass was first discovered by European-American traders in 1812; the first wagon trains crossed in 1832. Pacific Creek was the first water that the trains encountered after leaving the Sweetwater River at Burnt Ranch on the eastern side of the pass. Many wagon trains took the opportunity to camp and refresh at Pacific Springs, which is the first significant feeder into Pacific Creek.

See also
 Emigrant Trail in Wyoming

References 

Rivers of Wyoming
Bodies of water of Fremont County, Wyoming
Rivers of Sweetwater County, Wyoming